These Streets is the debut studio album by Scottish singer-songwriter Paolo Nutini, released by Atlantic Records on 17 July 2006. 
Preceded by the single "Last Request", the album debuted and peaked at number 3 on the UK Albums Chart and was later certified with five Platinum by the British Phonographic Industry for domestic shipments in excess of 1,500,000 copies. It also entered the charts in many other European countries, and in 2011 it was certified double Platinum by the International Federation of the Phonographic Industry for sales of over 2,000,000 copies in Europe.

Background
Most of the songs featured on the album were inspired by the end of Nutini's relationships with his long-term girlfriend Teri Brogan, and another girl which began when they were still in their teens. 
Among the others, "Last Request" describes the couple's last night together, while "Rewind" expresses the willing of turning back time before the end of another relationship were his lover left him alone in a hotel. 
Another auto-biographical intimate relationship served as the inspiration for the album's second single, "Jenny Don't Be Hasty", which tells about Nutini's involvement with an older woman who refused him because of his age.

Other tracks from the album explore different themes, like the title-track, which describes the feelings of a boy who leaves his hometown to move to a big city, or "New Shoes", a song telling about a man who finds life easier as he wears a new pair of shoes. According to Nutini, the song was written trying to imagine if solving problems could be as easy as buying shoes is.

Critical reception

These Streets garnered mostly positive reviews from music critics. Marisa Brown of AllMusic praised Nutini's ability to convey mature honesty by crafting songs that carry effective lyrics and catchy melodies, concluding that the record "won't blow anyone away with its creativeness or ingenuity, but it's done well and it's direct and open and enjoyable to listen to, which is more than enough." Nick Levine of The Observer saw potential in Nutini's "talent for elegant, melodic songwriting and an admirable willingness to vary the tempo." He concluded with, "[T]here is a glut of singer-songwriters right now but, on this evidence, the half-Italian 18-year-old boasts more talent than most." Rolling Stones Christian Hoard felt the album didn't have any replay value because it had songs that lacked strong choruses and recognizable lyricism, saying that "For Nutini's lady fans, These Streets might be something to get hot and bothered about, but most of us could take or leave this useless beauty."

Track listing

Personnel
 Paolo Nutini – acoustic guitar, vocals, background vocals
 Matt Benbrook – guitar, bass, keyboards, strings, programming
 Jim Duguid – double bass, drums, keyboards, percussion, piano, strings
 Eddie Harrison – guitar
 Vicky Hollywood – cello
 Michael Hunter – bass guitar, double bass
 Donny Little – acoustic guitar, slide guitar, background vocals
 The London Session Orchestra – strings
 Will Malone – string arrangements
 Michael McDaid – bass guitar
 Dave Nally – piano, organ
 Ken Nelson – electric guitar, piano, Hammond organ, recorder
 Pauline Taylor – background vocals

Technical
 Chris Athens – mastering
 Michael Brauer – mixing
 Dean Chalkley – photography
 Jim Duguid – A&R assistance, assistance, production
 Tom Elmhirst – mixing, production
 Robert Gold – art direction
 Andy Green – mixing, production
 Paul Wesley Griggs – photography
 Thomas Haimovici – A&R
 Dominic Leung – cover design
 Brendan Moon – A&R assistance, assistant
 Gregg Nadel – product management
 Ken Nelson – engineering, mixing, production, recording
 Conor O'Mahony – A&R
 Mark Pythian – engineering, mixing
 Richard Skinner – creative direction
 Richard Wilkinson – engineering
 Julian Wilmott – assistance

Charts and certifications

Weekly charts

Year-end charts

Certifications

As of 2007, sales in the United States have exceeded 114,000 copies, according to Nielsen SoundScan.

Release history

References

2006 debut albums
Paolo Nutini albums
Atlantic Records albums
Albums produced by Ken Nelson (British record producer)